Jalan Tandop (Kedah State Route 132) is a major road in Kedah, Malaysia. It connects Jalan Pantai Barat Kedah to Tandop.

Junctions and towns

Roads in Kedah